The House Small Business Subcommittee on Investigations, Oversight and Regulations is one of five subcommittees of the House Small Business Committee. The subcommittee was formed for the 107th Congress, when the Subcommittee on Government Programs and Oversight and the Subcommittee on Regulatory Reform and Paperwork Reduction were merged to create the Subcommittee on Regulatory Reform and Oversight. The first chair of that subcommittee was Mike Pence. During the  110th and  111th Congresses, it was renamed the Subcommittee on Investigations and Oversight. Since the 113th Congress, it has been called the Subcommittee on Investigations, Oversight, and Regulations.

Members, 117th Congress

Membership by Congress (chairs/ranking members pre-115th Congress)

 116th Congress 

 115th Congress 

 114th Congress 

 113th Congress 

 112th Congress 

 111th Congress 

 110th Congress 

 109th Congress 

 108th Congress 

 107th Congress

External links
House Committee on Small Business
House Small Business Committee Subcommittee page

Small Business Oversight